Goodbye to the Machine is the fifth studio album from American band Hurt, released on April 7, 2009, on the independent Amusement record label. The album was released in both CD and vinyl format. On February 3, 2009, the song "Wars" was released for download as a single. Each CD and vinyl comes with a unique code to download "ultra-high-quality MP3s sampled directly from the analog 1/2" master tapes," as well as bonus tracks, including "Flowers", "Another Time" and "That (Such a Thing) – Jazz Club Mix".

Track listing

Side 1

Side 2

Downloadable bonus tracks

Charts

Singles

Personnel
Personnel information from album liner notes
J. Loren Wince - vocals, violin, guitar
Paul Spatola - guitar, keyboards, background vocals
Rek Mohr - bass
Lou Sciancalepore - drums, percussion

Additional personnel
Shaun Morgan - vocals on "World Ain't Right"
Joe DeMaio - engineering, mixing
Michael Roberts - engineering, mixing
Eric Sarafin - mixing on "That (Such A Thing)"
Bernie Grundman - mastering
Ilene Novog - string arrangement on "World Ain't Right"
Sean Odell - artwork, design
Anthony Honn - photography

References

Hurt (band) albums
2009 albums